The Netherlands Football League Championship 1896–1897 was contested by seven teams from the cities Amsterdam, The Hague, Haarlem and Rotterdam. The teams participated in the competition that would later be called Eerste Klasse West. But since the western football district of the Netherlands was the only one to have a competition at the time, it could be regarded as a national championship. It was the last year that this was the case: next season would mark the first season of the Eerste Klasse East which meant that the national champion would be determined by play-off matches between the division winners. RAP won this year's championship.

New entrant
 HBS Craeyenhout

League standings

References
RSSSF Eerste Klasse West
RSSSF Netherlands Football League Championships 1898-1954

Netherlands Football League Championship seasons
1896 in Dutch sport
1897 in Dutch sport